Anton Brugmans (1732–1789) was Dutch physicist who proposed a two-fluid theory of magnetism. He did magnetism experiments by putting objects on water or mercury, using surface tension to make them float and magnets to move them. He discovered the diamagnetism of bismuth.

Publications

References

1732 births
1789 deaths
18th-century Dutch physicists